Houston is a masculine given name which may refer to:

Houston Alexander (born 1972), American mixed martial artist
Houston Antwine (1939–2011), American football player
Houston A. Baker Jr. (born 1943), American scholar
Houston Bates (born 1991), American football player
Houston Boines (1918–1970), American singer
Houston Branch (1899–1968), American screenwriter
Houston Bright (1916–1970), American composer
Houston Stewart Chamberlain (1855–1927), British-German writer
Houston Collisson (1865–1920), Irish priest
Houston Davis (1914–1987), American composer
Houston Fancher (born 1966), American basketball coach
Houston I. Flournoy (1929–2008), American politician
Houston French (1853–1932), British Army officer
Houston Gaines (born 1995), American politician
Houston Gwin (1876–1958), American football player
Houston Harte (1893–1972), American newspaper editor
Houston Hogg (1948–2020), American football player
Houston Jiménez (born 1957), Mexican baseball player
Houston Markham (1944–2019), American football player
Houston McTear (1957–2015), American sprinter
Houston Nutt (born 1957), American football player
Houston Oldham (born 1990), American soccer player
Houston Person (born 1934), American saxophonist
Houston Ridge (1944–2015), American football player
Houston Roberts (1905–1951), American serial killer
Houston Scott (born 1962), American harmonica player
Houston Stewart (1791–1875), English admiral

Masculine given names